The 2022 Sugar Bowl was a college football bowl game played on January 1, 2022, with kickoff at 8:45 p.m. EST (7:45 p.m. local CST) and televised on ESPN. It was the 88th edition of the Sugar Bowl, and was one of the 2021–22 bowl games concluding the 2021 FBS football season. Sponsored by insurance company Allstate, the game was officially known as the Allstate Sugar Bowl.

Teams
Consistent with conference tie-ins, the game was played between teams from the Big 12 Conference and the Southeastern Conference (SEC).

This was the second meeting between Baylor and Ole Miss; the Bears defeated the Rebels, 20–10, in Waco on September 6, 1975, these teams' only prior meeting.

Baylor Bears

Baylor completed their regular season with a 10–2 overall record, 7–2 in Big 12 games. Their losses came to Oklahoma State and TCU. The Bears defeated three ranked teams during the regular season: Iowa State, BYU, and Oklahoma. Baylor then faced Oklahoma State again, in the 2021 Big 12 Championship Game. While Oklahoma State had won their first meeting, 24–14, the Bears won the title contest, 21–16. Baylor entered the Sugar Bowl with an overall 11–2 record, ranked sixth in the AP Poll and seventh in the College Football Playoff (CFP) rankings.

Ole Miss Rebels

Ole Miss completed their regular season with a 10–2 overall record, 6–2 in SEC games. The Rebels lost to Alabama and Auburn, and defeated two ranked teams in FBS, Arkansas and Texas A&M. Ole Miss entered the Sugar Bowl ranked eighth in all major polls.

Quarterback Matt Corral was injured early in the first quarter and did not return to the game.

Game summary

Statistics

References

External links
 Game statistics at statbroadcast.com

Sugar Bowl
Sugar Bowl
Baylor Bears football bowl games
Ole Miss Rebels football bowl games
Sugar Bowl
Sugar Bowl